The 2012–13 Algerian Cup was the 49th edition of the Algerian Cup. The winners were USM Alger who qualified for the 2014 CAF Confederation Cup.

Round of 64
The round of 64 is the first national round of the Algerian Cup. On November 26, 2012, the draw for the rounds of 64 and 32 were held at a ceremony at the Sheraton Hotel in Algiers.

Round of 32
The round of 32 was held on the 28th and 29 December 2012.

Round of 16
The draw for the round of 16 was held on January 8.

Quarter-finals

Semi-finals

Matches

Final

Matches

References

Algerian Cup
2012–13 domestic association football cups
Algerian Cup